IFSC may refer to:

International Financial Services Centre, financial district in Dublin, Ireland
International Federation of Sport Climbing
Indian Financial System Code
Federal Institute of Santa Catarina, an educational institution in southern Brazil